Instart was an American multinational computer technology corporation, headquartered in Palo Alto, California. The company specialized primarily in improving web and mobile application performance, consumer experience and security. The company marketed and sold to large enterprises that seek to achieve higher digital revenue, increased on-line conversion, faster website performance, improved consumer experience and better online security.

The company also offered cloud services designed to increase  digital advertising revenue for media and publishing companies. These services included Advertising Acceleration, which improves digital advertising viewability and vCPM by speeding the delivery of digital ads, and advertising recovery capabilities that encrypt application content together with digital advertisements, so that ad blocking software cannot filter or block the ads, thus restoring advertising impressions and revenue.

The company claimed that digital enterprises using its services will achieve 5% to 15% higher on-line revenue via higher conversion, higher average order value, restored digital advertising and marketing functionality, and increased SEO traffic.

The company was headquartered in Palo Alto, California, with offices in New York, London, Bangalore and Sydney.

, the company claimed that it processed 60 billion transactions per day, optimized 5 billion images per day, served 200 million consumers per day and recovered 5 billion digital advertisements per month.

On February 27, 2020, Akamai announced that it had acquired Instart's customers and select intellectual property.

Products 
Instart developed and operated a Digital Experience Cloud that used artificial intelligence and machine learning to analyze the behavior of applications and of consumers accessing those applications, and then automatically optimizes HTML, JavaScript, images, video and other application components with a primary goal of improving application performance, consumer experience and security. For media companies, Instart offered Advertising Acceleration services that improve the viewability of display advertising, resulting in higher vCPM and revenue, and advertising recovery services that restore advertising impressions and revenue otherwise lost to ad blocking software.

Instart products included: 
 Instart Digital Experience Cloud  A suite of cloud services for improving the performance, consumer experience and security of cloud, web and mobile applications. Worked with Instart's CDN, or other CDNs such as Akamai.
Cloud and Web Application Performance Optimization  A cloud service that uses machine learning to automatically and continuously improve the performance of HTML-based applications, resulting in higher conversion and revenue.
 Mobile Application Performance Optimization  A cloud service that improved network and application performance for mobile applications, in congested or noisy cellular or Wi-Fi network environments.
 Image Optimization  A cloud service that used computer vision and machine learning to automatically optimize image compression, with a goal of delivering the highest visual quality at the smallest possible size.
 Tag Analytics and Control  A cloud service that provided dashboards and alerting about whether third, fourth and fifth party tags are operating normally, and provides automated control capabilities that can defer or promote tags to ensure reliable website performance or disable misbehaving tags.
 Advertising Acceleration and Viewability Optimization  A cloud service that sped the delivery of display advertising, increasing the time ads are viewable by consumers, and as such improving viewability, vCPM and revenue.
 Digital Advertising and Marketing Recovery  A cloud service that combined and encrypted content and advertising, rendering ad blocking software ineffective, thus recovering impressions and revenue.
 Web Application Firewall  A cloud-based web application firewall (WAF), implementing OWASP and additional application protections. 
 DDOS Attack Protection  The ability to block and absorb large DDOS attacks, protecting websites from downtime.
 Bot Management and Security  A cloud-based service that operated both on the consumer device and in the cloud to automatically identify bots and implement policies such as allow, throttle, block or log. Particularly useful for controlling web scraping and stopping credit card and gift card fraud, credential stuffing and reservation fraud.
 Instart Content Delivery Network (CDN)  A global content delivery network that was differentiated by being peering, last mile and mobile focused. Instart claimed it was the fastest CDN. Competes with Akamai, and Fastly CDNs.
 Nanovisor  A JavaScript-based container that executes in consumer web browsers, providing visibility and control over both first and third party content and services.

The company was named to the visionary category of the Web Application Firewall magic quadrant by Gartner Group in September 2017.

Architecture
Instart's Digital Experience Cloud most commonly was deployed as a suite of cloud services in front of company's application servers or digital commerce servers.  Instart's Digital Experience Cloud was independent of its Content Delivery Network (CDN). and as such works in conjunction with Instart's own CDN, or other CDNs such as Akamai and Fastly.

Instart was built with the understanding that third-party cloud services make up approximately 75% of modern web applications. To be able to control, protect and accelerate the entire application, including first and third party cloud services and content, Instart automatically injected a small ephemeral JavaScript-based container into every consumer web browser, which connects and coordinates with Instart's global cloud. The container provided visibility and control over all processing within the browser, including the ability to control first and third party http commands, HTML code and JavaScript code to improve application performance, consumer experience and security. The cloud-connected container also allowed Instart to shift the processing of third-party cloud services from the consumer browser to Instart's cloud servers.

History 
The company was founded out of frustration with the slow speed of downloading and updating video games.

In the fall of 2014, the company started a US$100 million contract buyout program for Akamai customers.

Instart was ranked by Business Insider as No. 1 among the 17 best startups to work for in America.

In June 2018, the company shortened its name to Instart from Instart Logic. Instart was a shortening of "Instant Start", which reflected the company's founding mission of making digital applications faster.

Notable clients included Neiman Marcus, Cafe Media, Edmunds, Bonnier, Ziff Davis, CBS, Tronc, TUI Group, Telstra and Kate Spade.

Acquisitions
In February 2016, Instart acquired Kwicr, a leader in mobile application acceleration for Apple and Android platforms, for an undisclosed amount to strengthen its mobile application delivery and analytics capabilities.

Financing
Instart had received $140 million in 6 rounds of funding from 10 investors:
 Series A: In February 2012 Instart Logic received $9 million as first round of funding
 Series B: In April 2013 Instart Logic received $17 million
 Series C: In May 2014 Instart Logic received $26 million
 Series C2: In May 2015, Instart Logic closed a $13 million expansion funding led by new investors Four Rivers Group and Hermes Growth Partners, in addition to existing investors including Andreessen Horowitz, Kleiner Perkins Caufield & Byers and Tenaya Capital
 Series D: In January 2016 Instart Logic received $45 million funding from Geodesic Capital, Telstra Ventures, Stanford-StartX Fund, Harris Barton Asset Management and participation from existing investors
 Series E: In November 2017 Instart Logic closed $30 million of equity funding led by ST Telemedia with all other prior investors participating

Other investors included Greylock Partners, Sutter Hill Ventures and Wing Venture Capital.

References

External links
 

2010 establishments in California
2020 disestablishments in California
Cloud computing providers
Companies based in Palo Alto, California
Content delivery networks
DDoS mitigation companies
Internet technology companies of the United States
Technology companies disestablished in 2020
Technology companies established in 2010